In mathematics, the ascending chain condition (ACC) and descending chain condition (DCC) are finiteness properties satisfied by some algebraic structures, most importantly ideals in certain commutative rings. These conditions played an important role in the development of the structure theory of commutative rings in the works of David Hilbert, Emmy Noether, and Emil Artin.
The conditions themselves can be stated in an abstract form, so that they make sense for any partially ordered set. This point of view is useful in abstract algebraic dimension theory due to Gabriel and Rentschler.

Definition 
A partially ordered set (poset) P is said to satisfy the ascending chain condition (ACC) if no infinite strictly ascending sequence 

of elements of P exists. 
Equivalently, every weakly ascending sequence

of elements of P eventually stabilizes, meaning that there exists a positive integer n such that

Similarly, P is said to satisfy the descending chain condition (DCC) if there is no infinite descending chain of elements of P. Equivalently, every weakly descending sequence

of elements of P eventually stabilizes.

Comments 
 Assuming the axiom of dependent choice, the descending chain condition on (possibly infinite) poset P is equivalent to P being well-founded: every nonempty subset of P has a minimal element (also called the minimal condition or minimum condition). A totally ordered set that is well-founded is a well-ordered set.
 Similarly, the ascending chain condition is equivalent to P being converse well-founded (again, assuming dependent choice): every nonempty subset of P has a maximal element (the maximal condition or maximum condition).
 Every finite poset satisfies both the ascending and descending chain conditions, and thus is both well-founded and converse well-founded.

Example 
Consider the ring

of integers. Each ideal of  consists of all multiples of some number . For example, the ideal

Let

That is, after some point all the ideals are equal to each other. Therefore, the ideals of  satisfy the ascending chain condition, where ideals are ordered by set inclusion. Hence  is a Noetherian ring.

See also 
 Artinian
 Ascending chain condition for principal ideals
 Krull dimension
 Maximal condition on congruences
 Noetherian

Notes

References 
 Atiyah, M. F., and I. G. MacDonald, Introduction to Commutative Algebra, Perseus Books, 1969, 
 Michiel Hazewinkel, Nadiya Gubareni, V. V. Kirichenko. Algebras, rings and modules. Kluwer Academic Publishers, 2004. 
 John B. Fraleigh, Victor J. Katz. A first course in abstract algebra. Addison-Wesley Publishing Company. 5 ed., 1967. 
 Nathan Jacobson. Basic Algebra I. Dover, 2009.

External links 

Commutative algebra
Order theory
Wellfoundedness